The Médaille militaire  is a military decoration of the French Republic for other ranks for meritorious service and acts of bravery in action against an enemy force. It is the third highest award of the French Republic, after the Légion d'honneur, a civil and military order, and the ordre de la Libération, a Second World War-only order. The Médaille militaire is therefore the most senior entirely military active French decoration.

During World War I, 230,000 médailles were awarded, when 1,400,000 French Army soldiers were killed and 3,000,000 wounded. For comparison, the UK Military Medal was awarded on 115,000 occasions in World War I, when 673,375 British Army soldiers were killed and 1,643,469 wounded. There were 628 awards to 627 recipients of the Victoria Cross, the United Kingdom's highest military decoration. 

The award was first established in 1852 by the first President of the French Republic, Louis-Napoléon Bonaparte who may have taken his inspiration from a medal established and awarded by his father, Louis Bonaparte, King of Holland.

After the First World War, the Military Medal was also temporarily awarded for wounds received in combat.

Statute
Like many other French awards, the médaille can be awarded for different reasons.  It can be awarded to foreign nationals serving with or alongside the French armed forces.

 To members of the military other than commissioned officers (including enlisted ranks, non-commissioned officers and aspirants or Officer Designate).
 As an award for valour, it is the second highest award ranking immediately after the Légion d'honneur.
 As an in between medal for enlisted members, NCO and O(D) awarded the Légion d'honneur for "combat actions", nowadays mostly done posthumously.
 As a service medal, for long-serving NCOs.
 To generals and admirals who have been commanders-in-chief, as a supreme award for leadership. These general officers must already have been awarded the grand cross of the Légion d'honneur.

Award description
The Médaille militaire is a silver laurel wreath,  in diameter, wrapped around a central gold medallion bearing the left profile of Marianne, effigy of the French Republic, the original 2nd Empire variant bore the left profile of Emperor Napoleon III.  The central gold medallion is surrounded by a blue enamelled ring bearing the gilt inscription "RÉPUBLIQUE FRANÇAISE" with a small gilt five-pointed star at the bottom for a 4th Republic award, three stars for a 5th Republic variant, the 3rd Republic variant bore the date 1870, the 2nd Empire variant bore the gilt inscription "LOUIS-NAPOLEON" in lieu of "RÉPUBLIQUE FRANÇAISE" and had flowers on both sides of the small star at the bottom.  The original variant was topped by a silver imperial eagle with a loop through which the suspension ring passed, all other variants were and are topped by a device composed of a breastplate superimposed over crossed cannons, a naval anchor, sabres, swords and battle axes, to which the suspension ring passes through a loop for attachment to a ribbon.  The reverse of the medallion is common to all variants since inception of the award, it bears the relief inscription on three lines "VALEUR ET DISCIPLINE" and is surrounded by a blue enamelled ring.

This ribbon was borrowed from the Order of the Iron Crown which it effectively replaced in France.

Recipients 

The Médaille militaire was awarded in some number to British and allied forces (allies of the French Empire) during the Crimean War of 1854-56 and in reasonably large numbers to allied forces in the 1914-18 war. During the Second World War, the Médaille reached its highest numbers of foreign bestowals, most often to members of the British Army as well as to the United States military. The general's médaille was awarded to Winston Churchill, Franklin Delano Roosevelt and Josip Broz Tito, as supreme commanders of the UK, US and Yugoslav military forces, but to also effective military leaders, such as General of the Army Dwight Eisenhower, and to Admiral of the Fleet Andrew Cunningham, 1st Viscount Cunningham of Hyndhope.

Unit award
In addition to the individual medal, the Médaille militaire is also authorized as a unit award to those military commands who display the same criteria of bravery as would be required for the individual medal. The médaille is displayed on the flag of these units. It is one of the rarest unit awards in the French military.

This unit award should not be confused with the fourragère de la médaille militaire, which is a cord suspended from the shoulder of a military uniform worn by members of units which had been mentioned in despatches. A fourragère aux couleurs du ruban de la médaille militaire (fourragère in the colours of the ribbon of the médaille militaire) is worn by units which had been mentioned four times, a fourragère aux couleurs de la légion d'honneur et de la médaille militaire (fourragère in the colours of the ribbons of the légion d'honneur and the médaille militaire) for units mentioned twelve times. Ten American units can wear the fourragère de la médaille militaire.

Notable French and foreign recipients (partial list)
The individuals listed below were recipients of the "Médaille Militaire:
 
 Private John Alexander  VC 
 Nurse and resistance fighter Berty Albrecht (posthumous) 
 Marshal of France (1864) François Achille Bazaine
 World War 1 pilot Arthur Bluethenthal  (posthumous)
 World War 1 African American fighter pilot Eugene Jacques Bullard 
 Sergeant Louis-Ferdinand Céline
 Sergeant Eugène Chavant
 Yvonne Chollet (posthumous)
 Marshal of France, Great Britain and Poland, Ferdinand Foch
 Prime Minister Sir Winston Leonard Spencer-Churchill 
 USMC Sergeant Major Daniel Joseph "Dan" Daly 
 Private Herman Davis 
 First sergeant Samuel "Sam" Dreben 
 President Dwight D. Eisenhower 
 Rene Joyeuse FFL / OSS (Captain) 
 Corporal François Faber (posthumous)
 Colonel René Paul Fonck
 Corporal Edward Foster VC 
 Russian flying ace Viktor Georgiyevich Fyodorov 
 Jean Gabin
 Police prefect Louis Lépine
 General of the Army Douglas MacArthur 
 Capitaine Georges Felix Madon
 World War 2 fighter ace Paul-Joseph de Montgolfier
 Field Marshal Bernard Law Montgomery, 1st Viscount Montgomery of Alamein 
 Norwegian Crown Prince and Chief of Defence Olav V 
 Corporal Thomas A. Pope  
 Father of the French Air Force, General Pierre Auguste Roques
 President Franklin D. Roosevelt  (posthumous)
 Marshal Henri Philippe Benoni Omer Joseph Pétain
 Master corporal Pierre-Auguste Sarrus
 Master corporal Pierre Schoendoerffer
 Partisan leader and Prime Minister Josip Broz Tito 
 Susan Travers French Foreign Legion
Marthe Cohn
 Corporal Clarence Van Allen

Recent Recipients for Valour

See also 

 Ribbons of the French military and civil awards

Notes

References

External links 

  France Phaléristique 
  Médaille Militaire information held by the Grande Chancellerie de la Légion d'honneur 

Military awards and decorations of France
Awards established in 1852
1852 establishments in France